Mikaël Pittet is a Swiss research scientist.

Biography
Mikaël J. Pittet (born May 23, 1975, in Lausanne (Switzerland) is Professor of Immunology at the University of Geneva (UNIGE), holder of the ISREC Foundation Chair in immuno-oncology  and full Member of the Ludwig Institute for Cancer Research Lausanne Branch.

Mikaël Pittet completed his PhD thesis in Immunology at the Ludwig Institute for Cancer Research and graduated from University of Lausanne (Switzerland) in 2001. Following his degrees, he moved to Boston (USA) where he pursued post-doctoral research at Massachusetts General Hospital (MGH), Harvard Medical School (HMS) and Dana–Farber Cancer Institute (DFCI). Pittet became Assistant Professor at HMS in 2006, Associate Professor in 2013, and Full Professor in 2019 (Department of radiology). He was named Samana Cay MGH Research Scholar in 2015  and appointed Director of the Cancer immunology program at the Center for systems biology in 2016. He was also a member of the Dana-Farber/Harvard Cancer Center and Immunology Program at Harvard Medical School.

He joined the University of Geneva (Switzerland) in 2020 as a Full Professor of Immunology, and holds the ISREC Foundation Chair in immuno-oncology. He was appointed a full Member of the Ludwig Institute in 2021. Pittet also leads the Translational Research Center in Oncohaematology (CRTOH) at the University of Geneva since 2022 and is a member of the Center for inflammation research. He is equally a member of the Department of oncology of the Geneva University Hospitals.

The Pittet Lab is located in Lausanne (Switzerland) in the AGORA cancer research center, which brings together interdisciplinary research groups of the Swiss Cancer Center Léman (SCCL) Léman (SCCL) working to accelerate the transfer of cancer research into the clinic.

Mikaël Pittet serves on the editorial board of the journals Cell Stress  and Cancer Immunology Research.

Research
Pittet is a widely cited researcher  in cancer immunology and cancer immunotherapy, especially in the fields of innate and adaptive immunity. His research focuses on uncovering how the immune system controls cancer and other diseases and how it can be harnessed for therapy. He is known for utilizing molecular imaging to track immune cells and drugs directly in vivo. Pittet's work has identified how cancers are regulated by various immune cells, including cytotoxic T cells, regulatory T cells, macrophages, monocytes, neutrophils, and dendritic cells. These cells are considered as drug targets in cancer immunotherapy.

Publications
As of 2022, Pittet has authored 146 publications in peer-reviewed journals and contributed to several textbooks. His work has been cited >40,000 times and he has an h-index of >80.

Awards and honors
Pittet's work has been honored with the 2015 Samana Cay MGH Research Scholarship Award, the 2016 Robert Wenner Award, the 2016 Distinguished Investigator Award  from the Academy of Radiology Research, and the 2017 MGH Mentoring Award. He also received a Honorary Master of Arts Degree from Harvard University in 2019 and is recognized as a Highly Cited Researcher based on his multiple papers that rank in the top 1% by citations across fields and during the last decade.

Selected publications

References

External links
 

1975 births
University of Lausanne alumni
Swiss emigrants to the United States
Harvard Medical School faculty
Living people
People from Lausanne
Swiss immunologists
21st-century Swiss scientists